Monica Lisa Stevenson (born April 21, 1967 as Monica Felicia Bowen) is an American gospel musician. Her first album, Finally...in God's Time, was released by Monicazmuzik in 2009. The subsequent album, Live in Atlanta, was released in 2013 by Central South Records. This was a Billboard magazine breakthrough release on the Gospel Albums chart and Heatseekers Albums chart. She was nominated at the 2009 Stellar Awards in two categories.

Early life
Stevenson was born on April 21, 1967 as Monica Felicia Bowen in Wetumpka, Alabama, the daughter of George Bowen and Pearlie Ellis, and the eldest of six children of the couple.

Music career
Her music recording career began in 2009, with the album, Finally...in God's Time, released by her own label, Monicazmuzik, on March 30, 2009. For this album, she was nominated at the Stellar Awards for Best New Artist and Traditional Female Vocalist of the Year. Her subsequent album, Live in Atlanta, was released on May 14, 2013 by Central South Records. This album was her breakthrough release upon two Billboard magazine charts: the Gospel Albums at No. 14 and Heatseekers Albums at No. 25. The Gospel Music Workshop of America counts her as a member. Her husband does the production for her albums.

Personal life
Stevenson is married to Derrick Stevenson, and the couple have five children, Qwenton, Khalon, D’errica, Derrick, Jr., and Zion, whom all reside in Atlanta, Georgia. They are members of New Life International Family Church, which is just outside the city in Decatur, Georgia.

Discography

References

External links
 Official website

1967 births
Living people
African-American songwriters
African-American Christians
Musicians from Alabama
Musicians from Atlanta
Songwriters from Alabama
Songwriters from Georgia (U.S. state)
People from Wetumpka, Alabama
21st-century African-American people
20th-century African-American people